Nattawut Innum (Thai: ณัฐวุฒิ อินนุ่ม) is a Thai long-distance runner.

He has a twin brother, Nattawat Innum (ณัฐวัฒน์ อินนุ่ม), who is also a runner.

On February 11, 2018, Nattawut Innum ran 29:48 for the 10K run at Buriram, Thailand, setting a new Thai national record for the 10 km road race.

References

http://www.the-sports.org/nattawut-innum-athletics-spf273684.html
http://www.forrunnersmag.com/runners/runnerinfo.php?runnerid=1014

Living people
Nattawut Innum
Nattawut Innum
1966 births